was a Japanese architect born in Karatsu, Saga Prefecture, Kyushu. Doctor of Engineering. Conferred Jusanmi (従三位, Junior Third Rank) and Kunsanto (勲三等, Order of Third Class). Former dean of Architecture Department at Tokyo Imperial University.

Tatsuno is most widely known for his work as the designer of the Bank of Japan building (1896) and the Marunouchi building of Tokyo Station (1914).

Education and early career
Tatsuno studied architecture at the Imperial College of Engineering where he was a student of the influential British architect Josiah Conder, called "father of Japanese modern architecture". After his graduation in 1879, Tatsuno journeyed to London in 1880 attending courses at the University of London. During his stay he worked at the architectural offices of the Gothic Revivalist William Burges. Burges died in 1881 during Tatsuno's stay, but before returning to Japan Tatsuno also took the opportunity to travel extensively in France and Italy.

On his return to Tokyo, Tatsuno taught first at the Imperial College of Engineering before becoming department head at University of Tokyo.

The organisation was based upon the Royal Institute of British Architects and the group met regularly, sponsored lectures and produced Japan's first architectural journal.

Tatsuno Kingo (金吾) was called Tatsuno Kengo as a nickname for him because Kengo (堅固) means firmness and his designs and layouts were solid.

Later career
Although his early work was influenced by his travels in Europe with traces of Inigo Jones and Christopher Wren, the Shibusawa Mansion (1888) was influenced by Serlio, Ruskin and Conder's own Venetian styled works. The site, on one of Tokyo's canalways suited itself to a Venetian character.

Bank of Japan

Tatsuno's connection with Shibusawa Eiichi brought him the commission to design the Bank of Japan in 1890 (completed in 1896). It was first building of its type to be designed by a native Japanese person. Tatsuno immediately set off to Europe for a year to do research for the project, studying amongst other buildings, the Banque Nationale in Brussels by Beyaert and Janssens.

The bank is a three-storey building constructed with reinforced brick faced with stone and has limited use of steel for long spans. Its style displays Neo-Baroque architectural influences. echoing European central bank buildings of the period. The original building was square in plan with the banking hall situated immediately behind the porticoed main front.

Tatsuno not only designed the Tokyo Head Office of the Bank of Japan, but was also responsible for designing the Bank of Japan's branch offices in Osaka, Kyoto, Nagoya, Kanazawa, Hakodate and Hiroshima. Almost two thirds of the 140 buildings that Tatsuno was associated with in his career were to be bank buildings.

Tokyo Station

Other than the Bank of Japan building, the structure most closely associated with Tatsuno in the later stages of his career is undoubtedly the Marunouchi facing side of Tokyo Station. The broadly Neo-Baroque design completed in 1914 is distinctive for its use of extensive steel framing and red brick with ribbed domes crowning the north and south wings of the structure. Much of the original steel framing was imported from England and the sturdiness of the design enabled the structure to survive both the Great Kantō earthquake in 1923 as well as wartime bombing and fires in 1945. A sympathetic 5-year renovation of the 1914 structure was completed in October 2012, restoring the domed roof structures that had been a feature of Tatsuno's original design.

Tatsuno also had a strong influence Japanese colonial architecture - especially in Manchukuo. Connection with construction firms like Okada Engineering, the Association of Japanese Architects (Nihon Kenchiku Gakkai 日本建築学会) or through the new Journal of Manchurian Architecture (Manshu kenchiku zasshi 満州建築雑誌),helped insure that a particular architectural style—that popularized by Tatsuno, sometimes called the Tatsuno style (辰野式) initially became the standard throughout Japanese Manchuria. This involved a somewhat grand interpretation of the style of historical eclecticism that was popular in contemporary Europe.

In 1903 Tatsuno set up his own architectural office, the first Japanese architect in the country to do so. He died as a result of the 1918 flu pandemic in 1919.

Other Noted Buildings 

 Bankers' Association Assembly Rooms, Sakamoto-cho, Tokyo (1885)
 Shibusawa Mansion, Kabutocho, Tokyo (1888)
 College of Engineering, Tokyo Imperial University, Hongo (1888)
 Hamaderakōen Station, Sakai, Osaka Prefecture (1908)
 The first school building of Kyushu Institute of Technology (1909)
 National Sumo Arena, Kuramae, Tokyo (1909)
 Nara Hotel, Nara (1909)
 The West Japan Industrial Club, Tobata, Kitakyushu (1911)
 Bank of Korea, Seoul (1912)
 Old Yasuda Mail Products, Yahatahigashi-ku, KitaKyushu (1912)
 Manseibashi Station, Tokyo (1912)
 Nanten-en Ryokan, Osaka (1914)
 Old Hyaku-Sanju Bank Yawata Branch, Yahatahigashi-hu, KitaKyushu (1915)
 Old San-yo Hotel, Kokutestu, Shimonoseki (1923)

Honors 

References

Bibliography
 Dallas Finn, Meiji Revisited: The Sites of Victorian Japan, Weatherhill, 1995 
 Louis Frédéric (translated by Käthe Roth), Japan Encyclopedia, 1996 (2002), 
 
 
 Ruxton, Ian, 'Tatsuno Kingo (1854-1919): 'A Leading Architect' of the Meiji Era', Chapter 33, pp. 443–455 in Britain and Japan: Biographical Portraits, Volume VII, Folkestone: Global Oriental, 2010

External links

 Tatsuno, Kingo | Portraits of Modern Japanese Historical Figures (National Diet Library)

Japanese architects
Academic staff of the University of Tokyo
University of Tokyo alumni
Deaths from Spanish flu
People from Saga Prefecture
History of art in Japan
1854 births
1919 deaths